The 2023 Osaka Mayoral Election will be held on 9 April 2023 as part of the 20th Unified Local Elections.

Election Information 
Scheduled to be executed upon the expiration of the term of current mayor Ichiro Matsui (term ends on April 8, 2023). Matsui, the incumbent, has expressed his intention to retire from politics at the end of his term due to the rejection of the proposal to abolish Osaka City and establish an Osaka Metropolis. Therefore, it is expected to be a contest between new candidates in the upcoming election.

Date of Public Notice / Date of Execution/Other info 
Date of Official Announcement: 26 March 2023

Election Date: 9 April 2023

To be held in conjunction with elections for the Osaka City Assembly, and the Osaka Prefectural Gubernatorial and Prefectural Assembly.

Declared Candidates

Potential Candidates

Osaka Restoration Association Primaries 
Fujita, Honda, Matsunami, Okazaki were primary candidates. Fujita, Honda, and Matsunami were defeated in the first round of voting, while Okazaki was eliminated in the final found leading to the victory of current mayoral candidate Yokoyama 

 Fujita Satoru - Osaka City Councillor (Joto Minato)
 Honda Rie - Osaka City Councillor (Joto Ward)
 Okazaki Futoshi - Osaka City Councillor (Higashinari Ward)
 Kenta Matsunami - Osaka Prefectural Councillor for Takatsuki and Mishima cities), and former member of the House of Representatives.

Others 
Yamakawa Yoshiyasu - executive officer of a civic organisation

On January 8, 2023, it was reported that he was considering running for office, but on February 15, he announced at a press conference that he was withdrawing his candidacy.

Timeline

2022 
September 30 - The Osaka Restoration Association announces its candidate for the mayoral preliminary election.

December 10 - The Osaka Restoration Association announces that Hideyuki Yokoyama, the candidate who received the most votes in the preliminary election for mayor, will be its candidate for mayor.

2023 
February 5 - It was reported that the political group "Update Osaka" intended to field Taeko Kitano, an Osaka City Councilor and former Secretary General of the LDP Osaka City Council. In order to gain broad support, Kitano is reportedly planning to leave the LDP and run as an independent candidate. On February 8, she officially announced her candidacy.

February 21 - Toshihiko Yamazaki announced his candidacy at a press conference.

February 27 - Yasuhiko Aramaki announced his candidacy at a press conference.

March 7 - Makoto Adachi announced his candidacy at a press conference.

References 

2023
2023 elections in Japan
Elections in Osaka Prefecture